Elzevir may refer to:

Places
Elzevir, Ontario, a township in Hastings County
Elzévir is a street that runs through the 3rd arrondissement of Paris. (See: 1, 2)
Elzevir Lake, lake in the Moira River and Lake Ontario drainage basins in Tweed, Hastings County, Ontario, Canada
Elzevir Creek, creek in the Moira River and Lake Ontario drainage basins in Tweed, Hastings County in Central Ontario, Canada

People
A pen name of Walter Murdoch
The House of Elzevir:, the name of a celebrated family of Dutch booksellers, publishers, and printers of the 17th and early 18th centuries
Abraham Elzevir (two by this name, father and son, 1592–1652), Dutch printer
Bonaventure Elzevir
Daniel Elzevir (published Richard Simon's work)

Isaac Elzevir (1596–1651), Dutch publisher and printer who began printing with one of the earliest printing press in the city of Leyden in the year 1617

Lodewijk Elzevir (c. 1540–1617), originally Lodewijk or Louis Elsevier or Elzevier, was a Dutch printer
Louis Elzevir (3 by this name, first was Lodewijk, then his son and grandson)

Characters

Elzevir the Dollmaker from the video game Blood Omen: The Legacy of Kain

Other
DTL Elzevir, a typeface by Christoffel van Dijck

See also
Elsevier (disambiguation)